The 1891 Minnesota Golden Gophers football team represented the University of Minnesota as an independent in the 1891 college football season. It was the only season under head coach Edward Moulton and it saw Minnesota's first out-of-state trip with a pair of games in Iowa. The first of these games was against Iowa College and ended in a 12–12 tie. The second game was Minnesota's first meeting with long-time rival Iowa and resulted in an 42–4 Minnesota victory.

Schedule

Roster
 Center, James Madigan
 Tackles, George Sikes, R. C. Dewey
 Guards, Charles G. Flanagan, Everhard P. Harding
 Ends, L. C. Edson, E.C. Bisbee, David R. Burbank
 Halfbacks, Eugene L. Patterson, William C. Leary (captain)
 Quarterback, Alfred F. Pillsbury
 Fullback, Charles S. Hale
 Substitutes, George Hawley, Russell H. Folwell, John C. Ohnstad, Grant B. Rossman, A. T. Larson, A. J. Harris, R. L. Cramb
 Coach/trainer Edward Moulton.

References

Minnesota
Minnesota Golden Gophers football seasons
Minnesota Golden Gophers football